Brian Michael Bonner (born April 13, 1984) is a former Canadian football safety. He was signed by the San Diego Chargers as an undrafted free agent in 2008. He played college football at Texas Christian.

Early years
Bonner attended A.C. Jones High School where he earned a total of nine letters (four in football, four in track and one in basketball). He played Quarterback in football, recording 3,180 passing yards and 2,477 rushing yards in his career. As a senior, he was named All-South Texas Quarterback and Offensive Player of the Year by the Victoria Advocate. He was offered football scholarships at Georgia Tech, Houston and SMU but elected to play at TCU.

College career
During Bonner's first two years at TCU, he saw little action. He redshirted in 2003 to make the transition from Quarterback to Safety, and was used sparingly in 2004. In 2005, Bonner led the team with four interceptions, two of which came in a win against Colorado State, which clinched the 2005 Conference Championship. As a junior in 2006, he was named First-team All-Conference as a Punt Returner and Second-team All-Conference as a Safety.

In 2007, Dave Campbell's Texas Football selected Bonner to their 2007 Preseason All-Texas College Team.

While at TCU, Bonner was a Communications major with an emphasis in Human Relations.

Professional career

Pre-draft
Bonner attended "Dallas Day," a pre-draft workout with the Dallas Cowboys.

San Diego Chargers
After going undrafted in the 2008 NFL Draft, Bonner signed with the San Diego Chargers. He was waived during final cuts on August 30.

New York Sentinels
Bonner was drafted by the New York Sentinels of the United Football League in the UFL Premiere Season Draft. He was signed with the team on August 5, 2009.

Edmonton Eskimos
Bonner was signed to the CFL's Edmonton Eskimos on April 25, 2011. He was released on September 7.

References

External links
Just Sports Stats
TCU Horned Frogs bio
United Football League bio

1984 births
Living people
American football return specialists
American football safeties
Edmonton Elks players
New York Sentinels players
People from San Patricio County, Texas
Players of American football from Texas
San Diego Chargers players
TCU Horned Frogs football players